Krasninsky (masculine), Krasninskaya (feminine), or Krasninskoye (neuter) is the name of several rural localities in Russia:
Krasninsky, Chelyabinsk Oblast, a settlement in Krasninsky Selsoviet of Verkhneuralsky District of Chelyabinsk Oblast
Krasninsky, Lipetsk Oblast, a settlement in Alexandrovsky Selsoviet of Krasninsky District of Lipetsk Oblast
Krasninskoye, a selo in Pushkinskaya Rural Territory of Prokopyevsky District of Kemerovo Oblast

See also
Krasnensky (rural locality)